is a 2016 Japanese drama directed by Kazuhiko Yukawa, based on the novel Families by Kiyoshi Shigematsu. By the first screenings, the film had earned ¥104 million (US$0.923 million).

Plot 
Yohei Miyamoto and Miyoko originally met at a matchmaking party at a family restaurant while at university days. Yohei planned to go on to grad school, and Miyoko had plans to be a teacher, however, Miyoko got pregnant. Yohei was confused, but did the honorable choice and proposed Miyoko. To support them, he took on Miyoko's role as a teacher.

The couple are forced to deal with their feelings with each other when their one child, 
Tadashi (Jingi Irie), gets married and becomes independent. Yohei and Miyoko only have each other as company for the first time and are taken back to their original circumstances. Then one day, Yohei finds out that Miyoko has filled out the divorce papers, after they drop out of a book. Will Miyoko give them to him?

Cast 
Hiroshi Abe as Yohei Miyamoto
Yuki Amami as Miyoko
Miho Kanno
Saki Aibu
Asuka Kudoh as young Yohei
Akari Hayami as young Miyoko
Aimi Satsukawa
Hana Toyoshima
Seishuu Uragami
Makiko Watanabe
Ayaka Konno
Jingi Irie
Kaoru Okunuki
Jiro Sato
Sumiko Fuji

References

External links

2016 drama films
2016 films
Japanese drama films
2010s Japanese-language films
Toho films